The Rabyanah Sand Sea, Rabyanah, is a sand desert region in the southeastern sector of Libya with a surface of approximately 65,000 km2.

Geography
The area of the Rabyanah Sand Sea is in the western part of the Libyan Desert in the Kufra District of the Cyrenaica region. It is named after the oasis town of Rabyanah located towards its eastern end.

Together with the Calanshio Sand Sea and the Great Sand Sea, the Rabyanah Sand Sea is part of the greater Libyan Desert.

See also
 Libyan Desert
 Calanshio Sand Sea
 Great Sand Sea

References

Cyrenaica
Deserts of Libya
Dunes of Libya
Ergs of Africa
Kufra District
Landforms of Libya
Sahara